Jay Gould (1836–1892) was an American financier and leading railroad developer and speculator.

Jay Gould may also refer to:
Jay Gould II (1888–1935), his grandson, American real tennis player
Jay M. Gould (1915–2005), statistician and epidemiologist 
Stephen Jay Gould (1941–2002), American biologist and author
Jay Gould (entrepreneur) (born 1979), American tech entrepreneur